Eric Francis Billings (born 1954) was chairman of Arlington Asset Investment [NYSE: AI] (prior to 2009, known as FBR Capital Markets Corporation). He has held this position since the company's formation in June 2006. He has also served as a director of the company since June 2006. Billings was also the chairman and chief executive officer of FBR Group, a position he assumed in April 2005. Prior to April 2005, Billings served as co-chairman and co-chief executive officer of FBR Group, a firm he co-founded in 1989.

References

External links
 FBR website

American chief executives of financial services companies
Living people
1954 births